One of the most striking features of Indian classical dance and dances of Thailand, Cambodia, Laos,  Myanmar and the Malay world and is the use of hand gestures. Speaking in dance via gestures in order to  convey outer events or things visually is what mudras do. To convey inner feelings, two classifications of  mudras (hand/finger gesture) are used in Indian classical dance, Thai dances, Cambodian dances, Lao dances, Burmese dances and Malay dances, and are indeed a prominent part of the dancer's vocabulary.

Background
The Abhinaya Darpa (a descriptive primer for dancers) mentions that the dancer should sing the song by the throat, express the meaning of the song through hand gestures, show the state of feelings in the song by eyes, and express the rhythm with his or her feet.

From the Natya Shastra, a text on the arts, this beautiful quotation and translation is often quoted by Indian classical dance instructors:

"Yato hastastato drishtihi"..."Where the hand is, the eyes follow"

"Yato drishtistato manaha"..."Where the eyes go, the mind follows"

"Yato manastato bhavaha"..."Where the mind is, there is the feeling"

"Yato bhavastato rasaha"..."Where there is feeling, there is mood/flavour, sweetness (i.e., appreciation of art; aesthetic bliss)"

So vast are the subtleties expressed in the hand gestures of hasta that the vastness of what being human entails, and perhaps even what the entire universe contains, might be expressed by the dancer.

Hence as 'hasta' form a distinct coded language which brings a unique poetic element while performing, so too when abhinaya (traditional facial expressions), pose (attitude), and rhythm complete the language, the dancer may express practically anything and everything to an attentive audience.

Gestures 
In Bharatanatyam, the Classical Dance of India performed by Lord Nataraja, approximately fifty one root mudras (hand/finger gestures) are used to clearly communicate specific ideas, events, actions, or creatures in which twenty eight require only one hand, and are classified as `Asamyuta Hasta', along with twenty-three other primary mudras which require both hands and are classified as 'Samyuta Hasta'; these fifty one are the roots but the branches permit of many more mudra, some of which are used primarily as aesthetic or decorative.

See also
 List of gestures
 List of Indian dances

 Adavu

References

 Indianartz.com. Hasta Mudras - Gallery.
 Ramm-Bonwitt, Ingrid (1987). Mudras - As Maos Como Simbolo do Cosmos.
 https://boardgamestips.com/wow/how-many-mudras-are-there-in-bharatanatyam/#How_many_mudras_are_there_in_Bharatanatyam

Dance in India
Dance in Thailand
Dance in Cambodia
Dance in Malaysia
Dance in Brunei
Dance in Singapore
Dance in Indonesia
India dance-related lists